Arbogast was a comes (Count) of Trier of Frankish origin in the late fifth century.

Arbogast is mentioned in letters sent to him by two bishops: one by Sidonius Apollinaris probably dating back to 471 or more probably 476-477 and another from 470 by Auspicius of Toul who addresses him as comes of Trier. This latter is found in the Austrasian Letters collection.

Arbogast was born into a Romanized Frankish family and was a Catholic Christian. His father Arigius (mentioned by Auspicius) was possibly a native of Trier, and one of his ancestors was the 4th century magister militum Arbogastes. Arbogast was obviously highly educated, and Sidonius Apollinaris (Epistulae 4.17) praises him as one of the last defenders of the collapsing Western Roman Empire and Roman culture.

Arbogast independently ruled his relatively small domain with the help of remaining Roman troops and Frankish foederati following the political disintegration of Gaul in the early 460s. Although Trier may have formally pledged allegiance to the Ripuarian Franks by 475, Franz Staab notes that Frankish graves are entirely absent from the area before 500. Arbogast's reign may thus represent a transitional period between Roman and Frankish rule. The culture of late antiquity died out soon afterwards in the sixth century.

Sources
 Penny MacGeorge (2002), Late Roman Warlords, p. 75.
 Hans Hubert Anton, "Arbogast. Comes in Trier", Reallexikon der Germanischen Altertumskunde, vol. 1, pp. 388f.
 Franz Staab, "Les royaumes francs au ve siècle", Clovis – Histoire et Mémoire – Actes du colloque international d'histoire de Reims, vol. 1, Presses Universitaires de la Sorbonne, December 1997, pp. 541-566, .

5th-century Christians
5th-century Frankish people
5th-century Gallo-Roman people
5th-century Latin writers
Ancient Roman generals
Comites
Correspondents of Sidonius Apollinaris
Frankish warriors